The European Formula 5000 Championship was a motor racing series for Formula 5000 cars held annually from 1969 to 1975. It was organized in the United Kingdom by the British Racing and Sports Car Club with each championship also including rounds held at European circuits.

The championship was first run in 1969 as the Guards Formula 5000 Championship. Various sponsorship and name changes followed, with the series run as the Guards European Formula 5000 Championship in 1970, the Rothmans F5000 European Championship in 1971  and 1972, the Rothmans 5000 European Championship in 1973 and 1974 and finally as the ShellSport 5000 European Championship in 1975.

The series was replaced by the Shellsport International Series in 1976 with Formula One, Formula Two and Formula Atlantic cars also eligible to compete.

Championship results

References